Histoire d'un crime is a 1901 French silent film directed by Ferdinand Zecca and distributed by Pathé Frères. The film stars Jean Liézer as the murderer and was based on a contemporary tableau series titled "L'histoire d'un crime" at the Musée Grévin.

Histoire d'un crime is considered the first French crime film and among the first to use seedy, realistic settings. Film historian Don Fairservice has noted Histoire d'un crime was "very influential." Zecca had convinced Charles Pathé that other film subjects could supplement the Pathé documentaries. His other films included comedies, trick films, or fairy tales, such as Les Sept châteaux du Diable, both 1901, and La Belle au bois dormant in 1902, as well as social dramas like Les Victimes de l'alcoolisme (1902), Au pays noir (1905) and reconstructions of actual events, the most famous being La Catastrophe de la Martinique (1902).

Plot
During a home invasion, a sleeping bank employee is awakened by a burglar. In the ensuing struggle, the burglar stabs the other man.  The next day, the burglar, an out-of-work carpenter, is arrested at a café while spending lavishly on wine. He is put on trial and found guilty.

While the burglar is being held in prison, he sees a series of flashbacks on his cell wall, depicting him as an honest workman with a happy home life but he soon begins to drink heavily. Becoming a burglar, he descends further into crime, finally committing a murder.

As the day of execution arrives, the executioners cut his hair off and a priest performs an expiation. The burglar is led to the guillotine and is executed.

Cast
 Jean Liézer as the murderer

Production
Histoire d'un crime is stylistically innovative in its use of superimposition of images. The story was of a man condemned to death, awaiting execution with his crimes appearing on his cell wall. The film is also an early example of flashbacks as a film device. The realism that was portrayed led to the film being stopped before the final execution scene to allow women and children to leave the theatre. Later, French authorities censored the film and required that the scene be entirely removed.

References

Notes

Bibliography

 Austin, Guy.Contemporary French Cinema: An Introduction. Manchester, UK: Manchester University Press, 1996. .
 Doane, Mary Ann. The Emergence of Cinematic Time: Modernity, Contingency, the Archive. Boston: Harvard University Press, 2002. ,
 Fairservice, Don. Film Editing: History, Theory and Practice: Looking at the Invisible. Manchester, UK: Manchester University Press, 2002. .
 Lanzoni, Rémi Fournier. French Cinema: From Its Beginnings to the Present. New York: Continuum International Publishing Group, 2004. .
 Paris, Michael. From the Wright Brothers to Top gun: Aviation, Nationalism, and Popular Cinema. Manchester, UK: Manchester University Press, 1995. .
 Rège, Philippe. Encyclopedia of French Film Directors, Volume 1. Lanham, Maryland: Scarecrow Press, 2009. .
 Schwartz, Vanessa R. Spectacular Realities: Early Mass Culture in Fin-de-siècle Paris. Berkeley, California: University of California Press, 1999. .

External links
 

1901 films
French silent short films
French black-and-white films
French crime films
1900s crime films
Films directed by Ferdinand Zecca